Polyspilota is a genus of praying mantises in the family Mantidae. Species of the genus are native to Africa.

Taxonomy
The following species are recognised in the genus Polyspilota:
 Polyspilota aeruginosa (Madagascan marbled mantis / Flag mantis)
 Polyspilota caffra
 Polyspilota comorana
 Polyspilota griffinii (Griffin mantis)
 Polyspilota magna
 Polyspilota montana
 Polyspilota pavani
 Polyspilota robusta
 Polyspilota saussurei
 Polyspilota seychelliana
 Polyspilota voelzkowiana

References

Mantidae
Mantodea genera